Imindounit is a town and rural commune in Chichaoua Province of the Marrakech-Tensift-Al Haouz region of Morocco. . It belongs to the Ait Achahrar family .At the time of the 2004 census, the commune had a total population of 9873 people living in 1621 households.

References

Populated places in Chichaoua Province
Rural communes of Marrakesh-Safi